Martina Caironi (born 13 September 1989) is an Italian Paralympic athlete. She competed at the 2012 Summer Paralympics and 2016 Summer Paralympics. She won a gold medal in the 100 m sprint in 2012 and a silver in the long jump in 2016. She qualified for the 2020 Summer Paralympics.

Biography
As a result of a motorcycle accident in 2007, Caironi had to undergo high-femoral amputation on her left leg.

Disqualification
On 17 October 2019, she was disqualified for having been found positive for a steroid contained in a healing ointment, prescribed by her doctor, to treat a severe inflammation of the amputated leg. However, the Italian national anti-doping court, recognizing the good faith of the athlete, reduced the disqualification by one year, therefore the disqualification expired on 9 March 2020.

World records
 100 m – T42: 15.87 (London, 5 September 2012)

Others achievements

References

External links
 

1989 births
Living people
Paralympic athletes of Italy
Italian female sprinters
Italian female long jumpers
Athletes (track and field) at the 2012 Summer Paralympics
Athletes (track and field) at the 2016 Summer Paralympics
Paralympic gold medalists for Italy
Paralympic silver medalists for Italy
World record holders in Paralympic athletics
Medalists at the 2012 Summer Paralympics
Medalists at the 2016 Summer Paralympics
Paralympic athletes of Fiamme Gialle
Medalists at the World Para Athletics European Championships
Medalists at the World Para Athletics Championships
World Para Athletics Championships winners
Paralympic medalists in athletics (track and field)
Italian amputees
Long jumpers with limb difference
Sprinters with limb difference
Paralympic long jumpers
Paralympic sprinters
20th-century Italian women
21st-century Italian women
Doping cases in paralympic sports